Automobile air conditioning systems use air conditioning to cool the air in a vehicle.

History

A company in New York City in the United States first offered the installation of air conditioning for cars in 1933. Most of their customers operated limousines and luxury cars.

On 7 October 1935, Ralph Peo of Houde Engineering, Buffalo, New York, applied for a patent for an "Air Cooling Unit for Automobiles". , was granted on 16 November 1937.

In 1939, Packard became the first automobile manufacturer to offer an air conditioning unit in its cars. These bulky units were manufactured by Bishop and Babcock (B&B), of Cleveland, Ohio and ordered on approximately 2,000 cars. The "Bishop and Babcock Weather Conditioner" also incorporated a heater. Cars ordered with this option were shipped from Packard's East Grand Boulevard facility to the B&B factory where the conversion was performed. Once complete, the car was shipped to a local dealer for delivery to customers.

Packard warranted and supported this conversion. However, it was not commercially successful because:
The main evaporator and blower system took up half of the trunk space (though this became less of a problem as trunks became larger in the post-war period).
It was superseded by more efficient systems in the post-war years.
It had no temperature thermostat or shut-off mechanism other than switching the blower off. (Cold air would still sometimes enter the car with any movement as the drive belt was continuously connected to the compressor—later systems would use electrically operated clutches to remedy this problem.)
The several feet of plumbing going back and forth between the engine compartment and trunk proved unreliable in service.
The price, at $274 (US$ in  dollars), was unaffordable to most people in depression/pre-war America.

The option was discontinued after 1941.

Chrysler Airtemp

The 1953 Chrysler Imperial was one of the first production cars in twelve years to offer modern automobile air conditioning as an option, following tentative experiments by Packard in 1940 and Cadillac in 1941. Walter Chrysler had seen to the invention of Airtemp air conditioning in the 1930s for the Chrysler Building, and had offered it on cars in 1941-42, and again in 1951-52.

The Airtemp was more advanced than rival automobile air conditioners by 1953. It was operated by a single switch on the dashboard marked with low, medium, and high positions. As the highest capacity unit available at that time, the system was capable of quickly cooling the passenger compartment and also reducing humidity, dust, pollen, and tobacco smoke. The system drew in more outside air than contemporary systems; thus, reducing the staleness associated with automotive air conditioning at the time. Instead of plastic tubes mounted on the rear window package shelf as on GM cars, small ducts directed cool air toward the ceiling of the car where it filtered down around the passengers instead of blowing directly on them, a feature that modern cars have lost.

Cadillac, Buick, and Oldsmobile added air conditioning as an option on some of their models in the 1953 model year. All of these Frigidaire systems used separate engine and trunk mounted components.

Nash integrated system

In 1954, the Nash Ambassador was the first American automobile to have a front-end, fully integrated heating, ventilating, and air-conditioning system. The Nash-Kelvinator corporation used its experience in refrigeration to introduce the automobile industry's first compact and affordable, single-unit heating and air conditioning system optional for its Nash models. This was the first mass market system with controls on the dash and an electric clutch. This system was also compact and serviceable with all of its components installed under the hood or in the cowl area.

Combining heating, cooling, and ventilating, the new air conditioning system for the Nash cars was called the "All-Weather Eye". This followed the marketing name of "Weather Eye" for Nash's fresh-air automotive heating and ventilating system that was first used in 1938. With a single thermostatic control, the Nash passenger compartment air cooling option was "a good and remarkably inexpensive" system. The system had cold air for passengers enter through dash-mounted vents. Nash's exclusive "remarkable advance" was not only the "sophisticated" unified system, but also its $345 price that beat all other systems.

Most competing systems used a separate heating system and an engine-mounted compressor, driven by the engine crankshaft via a belt, with an evaporator in the car's trunk to deliver cold air through the rear parcel shelf and overhead vents. General Motors offered a front-mounted air conditioning system made by its Harrison Division on 1954 Pontiacs with a straight-eight engine. It was very expensive and not a fully integrated system with separate controls and ducts for air distribution. The heater core continued to be a separate "Venti-Seat" or under the front seat system with its own controls. The unified alternative layout pioneered by Nash "became established practice and continues to form the basis of the modern and more sophisticated automatic climate control systems."

Growth in application

The innovation was adopted quickly and by 1960 about 20% of all cars in the U.S. had air-conditioning, with the percentage increasing to 80% in the warm areas of the Southwest.

Cadillac introduced the industry's first Comfort Control which was a completely automatic heating and cooling system set by dial thermostat for the 1964 model year.  

American Motors Corporation (AMC) made air conditioning standard equipment on all AMC Ambassadors starting with the 1968 model year, an innovation in the mass market with the base prices of the cars starting at $2,671. At the time, air conditioning was standard only on Cadillac limousines and Rolls-Royces.

By 1969, 54% of domestic automobiles were equipped with air conditioning, a feature needed not only for passenger comfort, but also to increase the car's resale value.

Air-conditioning for automobiles came into widespread use from the 1980s.

Evaporative cooling

A car cooler is an automobile evaporative cooler, sometimes referred to as a swamp cooler. Most are aftermarket relatively inexpensive accessories consisting of an external window-mounted metal cylinder without moving parts, but internal under dashboard or center floor units with an electric fan are available. It was an early type of automobile air conditioner and is not used in modern cars relying on refrigerative systems to cool the interior.

To cool the air it used latent heat (in other words, cooling by water evaporation). Water inside the device evaporates and in the process transfers heat from the surrounding air. The cool moisture-laden air is then directed to the inside of the car. The evaporate "cooling" effect decreases with humidity because the air is already saturated with water. Therefore, the lower the humidity, such as in dry desert regions, the better the system works. Car coolers were popular, especially among summer tourists visiting or crossing the southwestern United States states of California, Arizona, Texas, New Mexico, and Nevada.

Operating principles

In the refrigeration cycle, heat is transported from the passenger compartment to the environment. A refrigerator is an example of such a system, as it transports the heat out of the interior and into the ambient environment.

Circulating refrigerant gas vapor (which also carries the compressor lubricant oil across the system along with it) from the evaporator enters the gas compressor in the engine bay, usually an axial piston pump compressor, and is compressed to a higher pressure, resulting in a higher temperature as well. The hot, compressed refrigerant vapor is now at a temperature and pressure at which it can be condensed and is routed through a condenser, usually in front of the car's radiator. Here the refrigerant is cooled by air flowing across the condenser coils (originating from the vehicle's movement or from a fan, often the same fan of the cooling radiator if the condenser is mounted on it, automatically turned on when the vehicle is stationary or moving at low speeds) and condensed into a liquid. Thus, the circulating refrigerant ejects heat from the system and the heat is carried away by the air.

In a thermal expansion valve air conditioning system, the condensed and pressurized liquid refrigerant is next routed through the receiver-drier, that is, a one-way desiccant and filter cartridge that both dehydrates the refrigerant and compressor lubricant oil mixture to remove any residual water content (which would become ice inside the expansion valve and therefore clog it) that the vacuum done prior to the charging process did not manage to remove from the system, and filters it to remove any solid particles carried by the mixture, in addition to acting as a storage vessel for any excess liquid refrigerant during low cooling demand periods, and then through the thermal expansion valve where it undergoes an abrupt reduction in pressure. That pressure reduction results in flash evaporation of a part of the liquid refrigerant, lowering its temperature. The cold refrigerant is then routed through the evaporator coil in the passenger compartment.

When the expansion device is a simple fixed metering orifice, known as an orifice tube, the receiver-drier is instead located between the evaporator outlet and the compressor, and in this case, it is known as an accumulator. In such an air conditioning system, the accumulator also prevents the liquid refrigerant from reaching the compressor during low cooling demand periods.

The air, often after being filtered by a cabin air filter, is blown by an adjustable speed electric powered centrifugal fan across the evaporator, causing the liquid part of the cold refrigerant mixture to evaporate as well, further lowering the temperature. The warm air is therefore cooled, and also deprived of any humidity (which condenses on the evaporator coils and is drained outside of the vehicle) in the process. It is then passed through a heater matrix, inside of which the engine's coolant circulates, where it can be reheated to a certain degree or even a certain temperature selected by the user and then delivered inside the vehicle's cabin through a set of adjustable vents. Another way of adjusting the desired air temperature, this time by working on the system's cooling capacity, is precisely regulating the centrifugal fan speed so that only the strictly required volumetric flow rate of air is cooled by the evaporator. The user is also given the option to close the vehicle's external air flaps, to achieve even faster and stronger cooling by recirculating the already-cooled air inside the cabin to the evaporator. Finally, whenever the compressor is able to be commanded to operate in a reduced displacement, the vent temperature can also be controlled by acting upon the compressor's displacement.

Evaporator freeze over, which stops air from flowing through the evaporator fins, can be prevented in different ways. A temperature switch or a thermistor can control the evaporator coil surface temperature, and a pressure switch or sensing element can monitor the suction pressure (which is in relationship with the refrigerant's evaporating temperature). Both control means can act (either directly or by means of a control unit fed by their data) upon the compressor's clutch engagement status or, in the case of a variable displacement compressor, its displacement; additionally, a secondary valve located on the suction side can throttle the refrigerant flow so that the evaporator's outlet pressure doesn't fall below a precise value during system operation.

To complete the refrigeration cycle, the refrigerant vapor is routed back into the compressor.

The warmer the air that reaches the evaporator, the higher the pressure of the vapor mixture discharged from it and therefore the higher the load placed on the compressor and therefore on the engine to keep the refrigerant flowing through the system. Compressor load is also proportional to the condensing temperature.

The compressor can be driven by the car's engine (e.g. via a belt, often the serpentine belt, and an electromagnetically actuated clutch; an electronically actuated variable displacement compressor can also be always directly driven by a belt without the need of any clutch and magnet at all) or by an electric motor.

There are different methods for the repair and maintenance of the tube connections ensuring the refrigeration cycle. Conventional methods like soldering or welding lead to time and damaging soiling issues. The Lokring connection which is based on compressed fittings is easy to use and thus more time-efficient.

Power consumption

Although air conditioners use significant power, the drag of a car with closed windows is less than if the windows are open to cool the occupants. There has been much debate on the effect of air conditioning on the fuel efficiency of a vehicle. Factors such as wind resistance, aerodynamics, engine power, and weight must be considered, to find the true difference between using the air conditioning system and not using it, when estimating the actual fuel mileage. Other factors can affect the engine, and an overall engine heat increase can affect the cooling system of the vehicle.

See also
Sustainable automotive air conditioning

References

External links

Heating, ventilation, and air conditioning
20th-century inventions
American inventions
Automotive cooling systems